Botad Taluka is a taluka of Botad District, Gujarat, India. Prior to August 2013 it was part of Bhavnagar District.

Villages
There are fifty-three panchayat villages in Botad Taluka.

Notes and references

External links
 

Talukas of Gujarat
Botad district